Dębień  is a village in the administrative district of Gmina Rybno, within Działdowo County, Warmian-Masurian Voivodeship, in northern Poland. The village has a population of 316.

References

Villages in Działdowo County